West Stanley Football Club was a football club based in the mining village of West Stanley, County Durham, England.

Originally known as "Oakey's Lillywhites", the club was founded in 1889 and became founder members of the North Eastern League in 1906. Their highest league position was in 1949–50, when they finished as runners-up to North Shields.

The club first entered the FA Cup in 1905–06 when they were defeated in the 4th Qualifying Round by Northampton Town. The club's greatest success came in 1919–20, when they defeated Gillingham of the Southern League 3–1, before going out to Tottenham Hotspur of the Football League Second Division. The club also reached the first round proper in 1925–26, losing 4–0 to Rochdale, and 1931–32, when they lost 3–0 to Tranmere Rovers.

The club last entered the FA Cup in 1950–51 when they lost 2–1 in the first qualifying round to fellow mining village club Ashington.

West Stanley F.C. folded in 1959.

Players

Amongst the professional footballers whose careers included a spell at West Stanley were:
Tom Brewis (1907–1975), who played for York City and Southampton
George Browell (1884 – 1951), played for Grimsby Town F.C. and Hull City A.F.C.
Tom Cain (1874–1952), who played for Stoke, Everton and Southampton
George Davison (born 1890), who played for Coventry City and Bristol Rovers
Jack Hogg (1881–1944), who played for Sheffield United and Southampton
Jim Mackey (1897–1990), who played for several clubs including Coventry City and Torquay United
John Tate (1892–1973), Tate's football career includes a spell at Tottenham Hotspur
Arthur Thomson (born 1903), who went on to play for Morecambe, Manchester United and Southend United
 Jeffery Hunter (born 1925) (1952–1953) Played for several clubs including a spell with Blyth Spartans. Was the leading goal scorer for the team at this time. Still holds the record for the most goals scored in a match (Five consecutive goals) while playing for the Blyth Spartans.
 Joseph Edward Smith (born 1886), who played for Hull City, Everton and Bury.
 Alfred Douglas (born 1899), played for Brentford, Reading and Bristol Rovers.
 Jimmy Walton (1904–1982), played for Leeds United, Brentford, Bristol Rovers and Hartlepools United.
 David (Dave) Waggott (1880–1962), played for West Ham United.

References

External links
West Stanley F.C. on the Football Club History Database

Defunct football clubs in England
Association football clubs disestablished in 1959
Association football clubs established in 1889
Defunct football clubs in County Durham
1889 establishments in England
1959 disestablishments in England
North Eastern League